The Rank Organisation was a British entertainment conglomerate founded by industrialist J. Arthur Rank in April 1937. It quickly became the largest and most vertically integrated film company in the United Kingdom, owning production, distribution and exhibition facilities. It also diversified into the manufacture of radios, TVs and photocopiers (as one of the owners of Rank Xerox). The company name lasted until February 1996, when the name and some of the remaining assets were absorbed into the newly structured Rank Group plc. The company itself became a wholly owned subsidiary of Xerox and was renamed XRO Limited in 1997.

The company logo, the Gongman, first used in 1935 by the group's distribution company General Film Distributors and seen in the opening titles of the films, became a celebrated  and enduring film emblem.

Origin
J. Arthur Rank, born in Kingston upon Hull, UK, was already a wealthy industrialist through his father's flour milling business, Joseph Rank Ltd, before making his start in filmmaking by financing short religious subjects in line with his Methodist beliefs. Rank was a Methodist Sunday School Teacher and wished to introduce these beliefs to a wider audience. 

The Rank Organisation was founded in 1937 as a means for Rank to consolidate his filmmaking interests.

Filmmaking  in the 1940s
A loose collective of filmmakers was established by Rank under the banner of Independent Producers Ltd., employing some of the UK's greatest directors, such as Michael Powell and Emeric Pressburger (Black Narcissus, The Red Shoes, I Know Where I'm Going!), David Lean (Brief Encounter, Great Expectations), Frank Launder and Sidney Gilliat (I See a Dark Stranger, The Blue Lagoon, The Happiest Days of Your Life), Ken Annakin (Holiday Camp) and Muriel Box (The Seventh Veil).

The Company of Youth, the Rank Organisation acting school often referred to as "The Charm School", was founded in 1945. It launched several careers including those of Donald Sinden, Dirk Bogarde, Diana Dors and Christopher Lee. Although she was not a member of the school, Petula Clark was under contract to Rank for a period of time and starred in a number of films released by the studio, including London Town (1946), one of the costliest flops in British film history. Also under contract to Rank was the Canadian actor Philip Gilbert.

Growth
The company grew quickly, largely through acquisition. Significant developments included:
 1938 – Odeon Cinemas was purchased.
 1939 – Denham Film Studios were merged with the facilities at Pinewood and the Amalgamated Studios in Borehamwood were acquired, but not used for making films.
 1939 – UK sites of Paramount Cinemas purchased.
 1941 – Purchase of the Gaumont-British Picture Corporation, which also owned Gainsborough Pictures, 251 cinemas and the Lime Grove Studios.
 In the mid-1940s Two Cities Films became part of the Rank Organisation producing key films such as Odd Man Out (1947), Hamlet (1948), Vice Versa (1948) and The Rocking Horse Winner (1949).
 1946 – Bought for £1 million+ a 50 per cent share in a chain of 133 cinemas from New Zealander Robert James Kerridge, the biggest exhibition chain in Australasia; it was renamed Kerridge Odeon.
 Late 1940s – A majority shareholding in Allied Cinemas and Irish Cinemas Ltd was gained, becoming the largest exhibition circuit in Ireland (a position maintained until the early 1980s).

By the late 1940s J. Arthur Rank (or the Rank Organisation as it was now called), owned:
 Five major film studio complexes, Pinewood Film Studios, Denham Film Studios, Ealing Studios, Lime Grove Studios and Islington Studios (the studios at Lime Grove were sold to the BBC in 1949).
 650 UK cinemas (Gaumont, Odeon and Paramount chains) plus various international holdings, including subsidiaries in Canada and The Netherlands.
 General Film Distributors (later Rank Film Distributors), including the UK distribution rights to Universal Pictures.
 Rank Screen Advertising.
 Rank Film Laboratories, Denham (later rebranded DeLuxe London after Rank's acquisition of DeLuxe Laboratories from 20th Century Fox in 1990).

Crisis and diversification
Despite funding films which were both popular and critically acclaimed, Rank was in crisis by 1949, having built up a debt of £16 million, and reported an annual loss of £3.5 million. Managing Director John Davis cut staff, reduced budgets and concentrated film production at Pinewood. Other studio facilities (in Islington) were closed, sold (Lime Grove Studios) or leased (Denham). The Rank Organisation closed Independent Producers Ltd. The policies of Davis alienated many in the industry; in particular they led film director David Lean, responsible for some of Rank's most critically and financially successful films, to look elsewhere for backing. J. Arthur Rank stepped down as managing director of the Rank Organisation in 1952, but remained as chairman until 1962.

In October 1955 the company reported its film production was "satifactory".

Diversification
In 1949, the company bought the Bush Radio manufacturing facility and began to diversify its interests. In the early 1960s Rank took over Murphy Radio to form the Rank Bush Murphy Group (which was eventually sold to Great Universal Stores in 1978). In 1956 Rank began a partnership with the Haloid Corporation to form Rank Xerox, to manufacture and promote its range of plain paper photocopying equipment. In later years, the waning film company assets were hastily converted and pressed into 'Rank Xerox' service. This venture was a huge gamble but ultimately the company's saving grace, until, once more in financial difficulties, it signed off increasing percentages of its holdings, to the parent company, finally becoming fully integrated into Xerox in the late 1990s. Rank was also a significant shareholder in the consortium which became Southern Television, the first ITV television contract holder for the south of England. In the late 1950s, Rank set up Rank Records Ltd. (the record label was named Top Rank) and Jaro Records (a US subsidiary). In 1960, Top Rank was taken over by EMI, and in 1962 they replaced it with Stateside Records. Top Rank artists included Gary U.S. Bonds, the Shirelles, B. Bumble and the Stingers, Wilbert Harrison, Skip & Flip, Andy Stewart, Craig Douglas and John Leyton. A US branch of Top Rank operated from 1959 to 1961; its artists included Jack Scott, Dorothy Collins, and The Fireballs.

Rank Audio Visual was created in 1960, bringing together Rank's acquisitions in multimedia, including Bell & Howell (acquired with Gaumont British in 1941), Andrew Smith Harkness Ltd (1952) and Wharfedale Ltd (1958). Subsequent acquisitions included Strand Electric Holdings (1968) and H.J. Leak & Co. (1969). In the mid and late 1970s, Rank Audio Visual made a 3-in-1 stereo music centre, as well as TV sets in conjunction with NEC of Japan. The production of the "classic" Rank TV ran in the mid to late 70s, some interim models appeared and the "modern" Rank TV appeared in the early 1980s. The NEC badge did not appear in the PAL/220/240 volt countries until the mid-1980s.

Top Rank was one of the early operators of motorway service areas in the UK, opening its first services at Farthing Corner on the M2 in Kent in 1963. Top Rank operated a portfolio of 10 service areas until the takeover of Mecca Leisure Group by the Rank Group in 1991, when they were spun off to ex-Mecca CEO Michael Guthrie under the name Pavilion (later acquired by Granada and now forming part of Moto Hospitality). There were other small specialised groups, including Rank Taylor Hobson who made inspection equipment, Rank Cintel who made telecine (television film scanners) machines, and Gaumont Kalee who made audio analysis equipment.

Declining involvement in the film industry
During this period, Rank started focussing on primarily solidly commercial ventures, largely aimed at the family market. These include the popular Norman Wisdom comedies, the Doctor films series and, later, Rank took on  the Carry On film series from Anglo-Amalgamated. Films of note were produced during this era including Carve Her Name with Pride, Sapphire, A Night to Remember and Victim, as well as a clutch of prestige topics such as the Coronation of Queen Elizabeth II and filmed performances by the Royal Ballet. 

In February 1956 Davis announced Rank would make 20 films at over £3 million. He said "great care will be taken to ensure that, while retaining essentially British characteristics the films will have the widest international appeal. This is part of an intensified drive to secure ever widening showing in overseas markets which already return more than half the revenue earned by Pinewood films." That year, Rank announced it would set up distribution in the US. In October Davis listed the Rank actors he thought could become international stars: Dirk Bogarde, Peter Finch, Kay Kendall, Jeannie Carson, Virginia McKenna, Belinda Lee, Michael Craig, Tony Wright, Maureen Swanson and Kenneth More.

In October 1957, at the 21st birthday for Pinewood Studios, Davis said Rank would make 18 films this year and 20 the next, with the latter costing £5 million.

However cinema attedances fell. In September 1958 the company had lost £1,264,000 on films causing the group's profit to drop from £5 million to £1.8 million. John Davis wound up several long term contracts Rank had with talent. "The trouble with some of them is they won't work," he said. "They lose their sense of proportion."

In the late 1950s Sydney Box became head of production although he retired from the industry in 1959.

In January 1960, John Davis announced that Rank would concentrate on bigger budgeted, internationally focused productions. 

In 1961 they announced a production slate of a dozen films worth £7 million.

In October 1962 Lord Rank resigned as chairman of the company and was replaced by managing director Davis. That year to company made a group profit of over £6 million and stated 41% of its film production income came from overseas.

In October 1964 Davis reported profits of £4.6 million.

From 1959 to 1969, the company made over 500 weekly short cinema films in a series entitled Look At Life, each film depicting an area of British life. From 1971 to 1976, Rank only invested around £1.5 million a year in film production. According to executive Tony Williams "the two main streams that they were down to was Carry On pictures and horror films made by Kevin Francis". However, in 1976, Rank enjoyed much success with Bugsy Malone (which they co-produced with Paramount Pictures, who held its American rights). This encouraged them to re-enter film production.

Temporary revival and last years
In 1977, Rank appointed Tony Williams head of production and over two years Rank made eight films worth £10 million, including Eagle's Wing, The Shout, The Thirty Nine Steps, Riddle of the Sands and Silver Dream Racer. Many of these stories were set in the past. "You have to go back in time to tell a story that doesn't have to face seventies problems", said Williams in 1978. "What people are nostalgic for isn't necessarily any particular period, but the happier values that are missing today." Few of these new Rank films performed well at the box office, losing £1.6 million overall.

At the Cannes Film Festival in 1980, Ed Chilton of Rank announced a £12 million slate of projects. However, by June, they withdrew from production once again. "The decision was made to plunge on in and then it was pulled back", said Williams. The Rank films that had been announced for production – including an adaptation of HMS Ulysses, The Rocking Horse Winner and a film version of To the Manor Born – were cancelled. "It now takes too long to recoup money on films," said a spokesman for Rank.

The following year, Rank reported a record pre-tax profit of £102 million. According to Tony Williams:
After a time Rank Film Distributors was in trouble because they hadn’t got any new product. So Rank Film Distributors was then given chunks of money to go and buy into pictures because they made a blunder. And they carried on, on that basis, not directly making them and they had no direct control over what they made at all, no influence. They just bought into pictures. They did an output deal with Orion and that carried on until they sold the shooting match. Then the decision was made to get out of (the) film (industry), so RFD was closed down, Rank Film Advertising was sold off, eventually, the laboratories went. Cinemas was the last one to go.

In 1986, Rank Film Distributors, and archrival Cannon Screen Entertainment had inked a deal with the BBC to gain access to Rank's nineteen feature offerings. In 1987, the Rank Film Distributors group received a $100 million fund for film financing, and the Rank Film and Television division had invested in $32 million that they would take the budget against non-U.S. rights. In 1995, the Rank Group acquired all the outstanding shares of the Rank Organisation. In spring 1997, the Rank Group sold Rank Film Distributors, including its library of 749 films, to Carlton Communications for £65 million and immediately became known as Carlton/RFD Ltd. Pinewood Studios and Odeon Cinemas were both sold off in 2000. The company finally severed its remaining connections with the film industry in 2005 when it sold its DVD distribution business and Deluxe technical support unit.

Filmography
See List of Films Financed by Rank

See also
 Cintel
 Mutual Life Insurance Co of New York v Rank Organisation Ltd [1985] BCLC 11
 The Rank Foundation, founded by J. Arthur Rank and his wife
 The Rank Prizes
 Top Rank Suite, a chain of nightclubs owned by Rank

References

Bibliography
 Geoffrey Macnab, J. Arthur Rank and the British Film Industry, London, Routledge (1993), .
 Alan Wood, Mr. Rank, London, Hodder & Stoughton (1952).
 Quentin Falk, The Golden Gong: Fifty years of the Rank Organisation, its films and its stars, London, Columbus Books (1987),

External links
 Rank Group
 ODEON Cinemas
 American Rank Records listing
 Rank Organisation at BFI Screenonline
 The Rank Organisation at IMDb

Butlins
Carlton Television
British companies established in 1937
Mass media companies established in 1937
Film production companies of the United Kingdom
ITV (TV network)
1937 establishments in England
1996 disestablishments in England
Recipients of the Scientific and Technical Academy Award of Merit
Canadian companies established in 1937
Canadian companies disestablished in 1996
American companies disestablished in 1996